Juan Muriel Orlando (born 18 March 1989) is an Argentine footballer that currently plays for Deportes Santa Cruz in the Primera B de Chile.

Playing at Malaysia, he earned the nicknamed of 'Pistol' by Johor FA supporters due to his prolific goalscoring touch.

References

External links
 
 
 Muriel Orlando at Soccerzz

1989 births
Living people
Sportspeople from Buenos Aires Province
Argentine footballers
Argentine expatriate footballers
Club Atlético Huracán footballers
Colegio Nacional Iquitos footballers
Johor Darul Ta'zim F.C. players
Estudiantes de Buenos Aires footballers
León de Huánuco footballers
Rampla Juniors players
Deportes Copiapó footballers
C.D. Antofagasta footballers
Cobresal footballers
C.D. Olmedo footballers
Mushuc Runa S.C. footballers
C.S.D. Macará footballers
C.D. Cuenca footballers
Club Atlético Güemes footballers
Deportes Santa Cruz footballers
Argentine Primera División players
Peruvian Primera División players
Malaysia Super League players
Primera B Metropolitana players
Uruguayan Primera División players
Primera B de Chile players
Chilean Primera División players
Ecuadorian Serie A players
Primera Nacional players
Argentine expatriate sportspeople in Peru
Argentine expatriate sportspeople in Malaysia
Argentine expatriate sportspeople in Uruguay
Argentine expatriate sportspeople in Chile
Argentine expatriate sportspeople in Ecuador
Expatriate footballers in Peru
Expatriate footballers in Malaysia
Expatriate footballers in Uruguay
Expatriate footballers in Chile
Expatriate footballers in Ecuador
Association football forwards